Watanuki (written:  or ) is a Japanese surname. Notable people with the surname include:

, Japanese sport shooter
 Tamisuke Watanuki (綿貫), politician
 Yosuke Watanuki, tennis player
 Yusuke Watanuki, tennis player

Fictional characters
 Kimihiro Watanuki (四月一日), protagonist of xxxHolic
 Ruu Watanuki, a character in Kannagi no Tori
 Banri Watanuki, a character in Inu x Boku SS
Chihiro Watanuki, protagonist of Yugami-kun Ni Wa Tomodachi Ga Inai

Japanese-language surnames